Gami Gang is the second studio album by Emo band Origami Angel, It was released as a double LP by Counter Intuitive Records on April 30, 2021. The album was recorded and completed during the COVID-19 pandemic. Unlike their previous album Somewhere City which has more depressing lyrics, this album's lyrics are more fun and lighthearted

Reception 
Writing for Pitchfork, Abby Jones enjoyed the album. She states that when the album is at its best, It can feel limitless with ear-splitting power chords and double-bass drums paired with lighthearted humor and mathy elements. She also describes the album as "wistful", "daring", and "heartfelt".

Track listing

Personnel 

 Ryland Heagy – guitar, bass, vocals
 Pat Doherty – drums, percussion

References 

 https://pitchfork.com/reviews/albums/origami-angel-gami-gang/
 https://www.punknews.org/review/17494/origami-angel-gami-gang
 https://www.stereogum.com/2145336/origami-angel-gami-gang/interviews/qa/
 https://exclaim.ca/music/article/origami_angel_gami_gang_album_review
 https://www.sputnikmusic.com/review/83210/Origami-Angel-Gami-Gang/
 https://www.brooklynvegan.com/origami-angel-announce-new-double-album-gami-gang/
 https://www.popdust.com/indie-roundup-april-30-2652840408.html?rebelltitem=4
 https://www.pastemagazine.com/music/origami-angel/origami-angel-announce-gami-gang/

2021 albums
Emo albums by American artists
Indie rock albums by American artists